Greatest Hits Vol. 2 is the second compilation album by American country music singer Tom T. Hall released by Mercury in 1975. It reached #12 in the US country charts and was certified Gold by the RIAA.

Track listing

All tracks written by Tom T. Hall

Side 1
"Country Is" - 2:09
"I Love" – 2:06
"The Little Lady Preacher" - 2:53
"Sneaky Snake" – 1:57
"I Like Beer" 2:52
"Ravishing Ruby" 2:28

Side 2
"(Old Dogs, Children and) Watermelon Wine" – 4:09
"Deal" – 2:30
"Who's Gonna Feed Them Hogs" – 2:35
"That Song Is Driving Me Crazy" – 3:08
"I Care" – 2:01

Personnel
Strings and Horn arrangements by Cam Mullins
Vocal accompaniment by The Irwin Steinberg Aggregation

Production
Recorded at Mercury Custom Recording Studio, Nashville, Tennessee
Producer: Jerry Kennedy
Engineer: Tom Sparkman except “Sneaky Snake” and “I Care” engineered by Larry Rogers
Album photography: Ed Caraeff (at Fox Hollow, Franklin, Tennessee)
Album art direction: Jim Schubert
Album design: Joe Kotleba

References

1975 greatest hits albums
Mercury Records compilation albums
Tom T. Hall albums
Albums produced by Jerry Kennedy